Josef Kutheil (born 17 April 1939) is a Czech former skier. He competed in the Nordic combined event at the 1964 Winter Olympics.

References

External links
 

1939 births
Living people
Czech male Nordic combined skiers
Olympic Nordic combined skiers of Czechoslovakia
Nordic combined skiers at the 1964 Winter Olympics
People from Jindřichův Hradec District
Sportspeople from the South Bohemian Region